The Spartan Three Seater was a British three-seat biplane touring and pleasure-flying aircraft built by Spartan Aircraft Limited.

History
Built as a three-seat version of the Simmonds Spartan, the Three Seater was a biplane with a spruce and plywood fuselage. Although not many aircraft were built, the Three Seater was a mainstay of the pleasure flying business in the 1930s. The wings were designed to fold back easily, in order to be stored in a shed rather than requiring a dedicated hangar.

Following the first batch of aircraft, designated the Three Seater I, an improved version was built and designated as the Three Seater II. The six Three Seater IIs had improved visibility for the pilot and easier access for the passengers, and were powered by a  Cirrus Hermes IV engine.

One Three Seater II (registered as ZK-ARH) currently survives, owned by a private individual in New Zealand, having passed through British and Irish owners (as G-ABYN and EI-ABU) since its manufacture in June 1932.

Variants
Three Seater I - 19 aircraft
Three Seater II - 6 aircraft

Operators
The aircraft was mainly operated by flying clubs and private individuals:

 Iraq Airwork Limited

 British Airways Limited

Specifications (Three Seater II)

References

1930s British civil utility aircraft
Three Seater
Biplanes
Single-engined tractor aircraft
Aircraft first flown in 1930